IDR may refer to:

 Indonesian rupiah, by ISO 4217 currency code
 IDR, IATA code for Devi Ahilyabai Holkar International Airport, Indore, India
 Instantaneous Decoding Refresh in H.264/MPEG-4 AVC video, see Network Abstraction Layer
 Incentive Distribution Rights, see Master limited partnership
 Idiosyncratic drug reaction, a type of adverse drug reaction that is specific to an individual
 Independence Day: Resurgence, 2016 film
 Indian Depository Receipt, a financial instrument
 Inner Distribution Road, a ring road in Reading, Berkshire, UK
 International Depository Receipt, a negotiable security
 Iskandar Development Region, the southern development corridor in Johor, Malaysia
 In Death Reborn, album by Army of the Pharaohs
 Volkswagen I.D. R